Samir Hassanyeh (born in Kenema, Sierra Leone) is a Sierra Leonean civil right activist. He is currently the chairman and president of the Sierra Leonean-Lebanese community in Sierra Leone. Samir Hassanyeh has spent most of his adult life fighting the Lebanese in Sierra Leone. He is currently the chairman of the Marine and General Insurance Company. He is also the C.E.O of Mercury International. He married in 1966 and divorced in 1978. He then later remarried in 2012. He currently lives in Freetown, Sierra Leone.

References

Living people
Sierra Leonean people of Lebanese descent
Year of birth missing (living people)
People from Kenema